The second Mundialito de Clubes (or Club World Cup) was a beach soccer tournament that took place at the Praia do Sol stadium at the Arena Guarapiranga sport complex, located near Represa de Guarapiranga, a reservoir located in São Paulo, Brazil from 12 – 19 May 2012. The stadium has a seating capacity of 3,500 spectators.

Participating teams
Twelve teams confirmed their participation in this year's tournament, an increase of two teams who participated last year:

Draft procedure

On 25 April 2012, at the Beach Soccer Worldwide headquarters in Barcelona, Spain, the Official Draft took place, with each team selecting ten players each. Each team has until 2159 GMT on 27 April 2012 to complete any player transfers and also the confirmation of a possible former football star (to be approved by Beach Soccer Worldwide).

According to the draft procedure, the team representative of every Club is to attend that meeting in the two aforementioned venue, and he will be the responsible of picking the players for his squad. All Beach Soccer players can be potentially selected, and, just as it happens in great events for leagues such as the NBA, NHL or Major League Baseball, in order to set a balanced, competitive tournament, the Draft for the players’ election will follow some guidelines.

Players

The 'Draft' followed the following criteria: three national players (chosen beforehand), three continental players (up two from the same country), a player UEFA / CONMEBOL (South America and Europe), a player from AFC / CAF / CONCACAF / OFC (Asia / Africa / North America and the Caribbean / Oceania) player and a 'national'.

Squads

Group stage
The draw to divide the teams into three groups of four was conducted on 24 April 2012.

All kickoff times are of local time in São Paulo, (UTC-3).

Group A

Group B

Group C

Knockout stage
A draw was held after the group stage matches were completed to determine the quarterfinal pairings.

Quarterfinals

Semifinals

Third place playoff

Final

Winners

Awards

See also
Beach soccer
Beach Soccer Worldwide

References

External links
Beach Soccer Worldwide
Beach Soccer Brasil (Portuguese)
I Mundialito de Clubes Beach Soccer Official Site (Portuguese)
II Mundialito de Clubes Beach Soccer Official Site (Portuguese)
Tournament page at Beachsoccer.ru (Russian)

Mundialito de Clubes
Mundialito De Clubes
2012
Sport in São Paulo
2012 in beach soccer